Adam Hollander (October 14, 1964 – September 24, 1984) was an American film and television actor.

Biography
Hollander was born in Los Angeles, California. He had been best known for portraying Keith in the horror classic Halloween. Hollander's last film was The Sting II playing the delivery boy. Hollander appeared on 1 episode of the television series Welcome Back, Kotter playing the punk. Hollander's film debut was The City playing Kenny.

Hollander died on September 24, 1984. Hollander was riding a bicycle in Albuquerque, New Mexico and was hit by a car. He died later at the Rehabilitation Hospital of New Mexico. He was 19 years old.

Filmography

References

External links

1964 births
1984 deaths
American male film actors
American male television actors
Road incident deaths in New Mexico
Cycling road incident deaths
Male actors from Los Angeles
20th-century American male actors